Dance of Life may refer to:
The Dance of Life (painting)
The Dance of Life, film
The Dance of Life (album)

See also
DanceLife